"Ready to Run" is a song recorded by American country music group Dixie Chicks. It was co-written by the group's fiddler, Martie Seidel (now Martie Maguire) along with Marcus Hummon.  It was released in June 1999 as the lead-off single to the band's album Fly, and their sixth entry on the Billboard Hot Country Singles & Tracks chart, reaching number two. This song was featured on the film soundtrack for Runaway Bride, starring Richard Gere and Julia Roberts.

Content
"Ready to Run" is a moderate up-tempo in the key of G major, with an intro played by fiddle and penny whistle, before electric guitar and banjo join in as well. The song describes a female who is "ready this time"; specifically, that she is "ready to run" away from her wedding because she does not feel that she is ready to fall in love.

Critical reception
The song received positive reviews from critics. Rob Sheffield of Rolling Stone magazine gave the song a favorable mention, saying that it "sets the emotional and musical tone of the album, revving up the guitars to a graceful Celtic motif".

In 1999, "Ready to Run" won the Grammy Award for Best Country Performance by a Duo or Group with Vocal.

The song has been a staple of the group's concerts, appearing on the 2000 Fly Tour as the show opener, on the 2003 Top of the World Tour near the end of the main set, and on the 2006 Accidents & Accusations Tour as the final encore.

Music video
The music video for the song was a visually comic one that portrayed the Chicks as brides at a triple wedding. Before the ceremony is over, they reveal they are wearing sneakers instead of bridal shoes, and they run away, jumping on the back of a garbage truck and then pedalling away on bicycles. The jilted grooms chase them through the neighborhood, and they all end up back at the wedding site, engaging in a friendly food fight before joining in a circle dance.  At the conclusion, the still-unmarried Chicks are seen collapsing to the grass by themselves in exhaustion.

The video placed at #26 on CMT's 2004 ranking of the 100 Greatest Videos.

Chart performance

Year-end charts

References

1999 singles
1999 songs
The Chicks songs
Songs written by Marcus Hummon
Songs written by Martie Maguire
Song recordings produced by Paul Worley
Monument Records singles
Song recordings produced by Blake Chancey